The Franklin Stakes is a Grade III American Thoroughbred horse race for fillies and mares that are three years old or older, over a distance of  furlongs on the turf held annually in October at Keeneland Race Course, Lexington, Kentucky during the autumn meeting.  The event currently carries a purse of $300,000.

History 
The event is named in honor of Franklin County which is adjacent to Keeneland Race Course.

The race was inaugurated on 18 October 1997 as the A. P. Indy Stakes in honor of the 1992 American Horse of the Year A.P. Indy. The inaugural event was run in split divisions.

In 2003 the event was renamed to the Clark County Stakes, a Kentucky county adjacent to Lexington.

In 2005 the event was renamed to the Franklin County Stakes. The 2006 running was moved to the All Weather Track.  In 2016 the event was upgraded to a Grade III

The name of the event was modified in 2022 to the Franklin Stakes.

Records
Speed record: 
  furlongs – 1:01.72 - Chris's Thunder (2000)

Margins: 
  lengths – Affair With Aflair  (1997)

Most wins
 2 – Ayrial Delight (1998, 1999)

Most wins by a jockey
 3 – Joel Rosario  (2014, 2016, 2019)
 3 – Pat Day (1998, 2000, 2004)

Most wins by a trainer
 2 – H. Graham Motion (2001, 2016)
 2 – Ronald James Taylor (1998, 1999)

Most wins by an owner

 2 – Dwight M. Mentzer (1998, 1999)

Winners 

Legend:

See also 
 List of American and Canadian Graded races

References

Graded stakes races in the United States
Grade 3 stakes races in the United States
Recurring sporting events established in 1997
Keeneland horse races
1997 establishments in Kentucky
Sprint category horse races for fillies and mares
Horse races in Kentucky